Cerro Piergiorgio is a mountain in Los Glaciares National Park in province of Santa Cruz in Patagonia, near the village of El Chaltén, at the border between Argentina and Chile. Its altitude is 2719 m.

References

Piergiorgio
Piergiorgio
Landforms of O'Higgins Region
Landforms of Santa Cruz Province, Argentina
Argentina–Chile border
Piergiorgio